Apicidin is a fungal metabolite, as well as a histone deacetylase inhibitor.

References

Histone deacetylase inhibitors